Saphenista turguinoa is a species of moth of the family Tortricidae. It is found on Cuba.

The wingspan is about 8 mm. The ground colour of the forewings is cream hardly mixed with brownish yellow, with browner strigulation (fine streaks). The markings are brownish yellow. The hindwings are pale brownish grey, but paler basally than on the periphery.

Etymology
The species name refers to Turguino, the type locality.

References

Moths described in 2007
Saphenista
Endemic fauna of Cuba